St John Loveday is a fictional character in the Loveday books written by Kate Tremayne.

According to genealogical information provided in the books, he was born 1767 as the son of Edward and Marie Loveday. His twin brother is Adam Loveday.

Although the two men are twins, they are not identical in either appearance or temperament. St John is described as being shorter and stockier than Adam, though he is still considered handsome by most people who meet him.

Unlike Adam, who is hard working and determined, St John is fickle and dissolute. He craves a life of indulgence and luxury, and would prefer to spend his days gambling and womanising. He is fiercely jealous towards Adam, who he believes is more favoured by his father. This jealousy is heightened when his father changes his will to make Adam heir to the family shipyard.

Seeing that Adam had fallen in love with Meriel Sawle, St John forcefully seduces her with the intent to win her from his twin. He gets more than he bargained for however when she falls pregnant and he is forced to marry her.

Literary characters introduced in 1999